The Llajas Formation is a non-marine to marine conglomerate geologic formation in Southern California.

It is found in the Transverse Ranges geologic province, within Los Angeles County and Ventura County.  Locations include the Simi Hills, Simi Valley, and Santa Susana Mountains.

Fossils
It preserves fossils dating back to the early and middle Eocene epoch of the Paleogene period.

See also

 List of fossiliferous stratigraphic units in California

References

Conglomerate formations
Geology of Los Angeles County, California
Geology of Ventura County, California
Eocene Series of North America
Paleogene California
Simi Hills
Santa Susana Mountains
Geologic formations of California